Gordon Chang may refer to:

Gordon G. Chang (born 1951), American lawyer, author, and commentator
Gordon H. Chang (born 1948), American historian and professor at Stanford University

See also
Gordon Chan